Coleophora pterosparti is a moth of the family Coleophoridae. It is found on the Iberian Peninsula.

The larvae feed on Chamaespartium tridentatum. They create a spatulate leaf case, made from the mined apical part of a phyllodium. Larvae can be found from January to April.

References

pterosparti
Moths of Europe
Moths described in 1910